This article contains a list of fossil-bearing stratigraphic units in the state of Iowa, U.S.

Sites

See also

 Paleontology in Iowa

References

 

Iowa
Stratigraphic units
Stratigraphy of Iowa
Iowa geography-related lists
United States geology-related lists